Miss International 1980, the 20th anniversary of the Miss International pageant, was held on 4 November 1980 at Mielparque in Tokyo, Japan. Melanie Marquez of the Philippines crowned her successor Lorna Chávez of Costa Rica at the end of the event, earning the first Miss International crown for Costa Rica.

Results

Placements

Special awards

Contestants

  - Viviana Teresa Reduello
  - Debbie Newsome
  - Manuela Kier
  - Ann Claude Phillipps
  - Maria Beatriz Landívar Olmos
  - Fernanda Boscolo de Camargo
  - Lorraine Davidson
  - Marie Rinaz
  - Mónica Salinas Ruiz
  - Ana Maria Uribe Giraldo
  - Lorna Chávez
  - Jane Margrethe Vinstrup
  - Paula Nieminen
  - Sylvie Hélène Marie Parera
  - Petra Machalinski
  - Katerina Manaraki
  - Conchita Sannicolas Taitano
  - Desirée Juana Cruz
  - Jacqueline Boutien
  - Jennifer Bustillo
  - Janet Wong Ching
  - Ulrike Karen Bredemeyer
  - Mary Banadeth Hadaman
  - Irit Altmann
  - Angela Marcat
  - Mayumi Kanbara
  - Chung Na-young
  - Christina Leong
  - Mari Rieta Violet Milz
  - Narda Sabag Cianca
  - Maria Theresa MacLeudo
  - Heidi Louise Oiseth
  - Diana Jeanne Christine Alegarme Chiong
  - Jennifer Liong Lai Fong
  - María Agustina García Alcaide
  - Raili Ranta
  - Jolanda Egger
  - Wanalee Te-meerak
  - Nükhet Vural
  - Erna Isabel Alfonso
  - Charissa Ann Ewing
  - Grazia Lucía (Graciela) La Rosa Guarnieri

1980
1980 in Tokyo
1980 beauty pageants
Beauty pageants in Japan